Muamer Vugdalić (born 25 August 1977) is a Slovenian football manager and former player.

Club career
Born to Sabahudin Vugdalić, Muamer's early years of his career were associated with Olimpija. He made his first team debut in May 1995 against Jadran Dekani. In 1998, he moved to Maribor. As a Maribor player, he played in the UEFA Champions League in the 1999–2000 season. In 2001, he signed a contract with Ukrainian side Shakhtar Donetsk. After only four appearances for Shakhtar, he returned to Maribor in December 2001. He stayed there two and a half seasons. After that, he played for Domžale, AEL Limassol, Niki Volos and Interblock, before he signed a contract with Željezničar Sarajevo in July 2007. After season in Bosnia and Herzegovina he signed with Olimpija Ljubljana.

International career
On 9 October 1999, he made his debut for Slovenia national football team against Greece. He played 27 times for the Slovenian national team and was a part of the Slovenian 2002 FIFA World Cup squad.

Honours
Olimpija
Slovenian Championship: 1994–95
Slovenian Cup: 1995–96

Maribor
Slovenian Championship: 1998–99, 1999–2000, 2000–01, 2001–02, 2002–03
Slovenian Cup: 1998–99

Olimpija Ljubljana
Slovenian Second League: 2008–09

References

External links 
Player profile at NZS 

1977 births
Living people
Footballers from Rijeka
Slovenian footballers
Slovenian expatriate footballers
Association football defenders
NK Olimpija Ljubljana (1945–2005) players
NK Maribor players
FC Shakhtar Donetsk players
NK Domžale players
AEL Limassol players
Niki Volos F.C. players
NK IB 1975 Ljubljana players
FK Željezničar Sarajevo players
NK Olimpija Ljubljana (2005) players
NK Bela Krajina players
Slovenian PrvaLiga players
Ukrainian Premier League players
Cypriot First Division players
Premier League of Bosnia and Herzegovina players
Slovenian Second League players
Expatriate footballers in Ukraine
Slovenian expatriate sportspeople in Ukraine
Expatriate footballers in Cyprus
Slovenian expatriate sportspeople in Cyprus
Expatriate footballers in Bosnia and Herzegovina
Slovenian expatriate sportspeople in Bosnia and Herzegovina
2002 FIFA World Cup players
Slovenia youth international footballers
Slovenia under-21 international footballers
Slovenia international footballers
Slovenian football managers
Bosniaks of Slovenia